Giannochorio (before 1927: Γιαννοβαίνη - Giannovaini) is a village in Kastoria Regional Unit, Macedonia, Greece.

Giannochorio was an Albanian speaking village with a Christian population in a wider Slavic speaking area. As a bilingual village, both the Albanian and (Slavic) Macedonian languages were spoken. Later Giannochorio became a monolingual Slavophone village, in particular its female villagers, followed by a new bilingualism with Greek as a second language.

References

Populated places in Kastoria (regional unit)